The 2018–19 V-League season eas the 15th season of the V-League, the highest professional volleyball league in South Korea. The season started on 13 October 2018 and finished on 27 March 2019. 

Cheonan Hyundai Capital Skywalkers claimed their fourth championship in the men's league

Teams

Men's clubs

Women's clubs

Season standing procedure 
 Match points
 Number of matches won
 Sets ratio
 Points ratio
 Result of the last match between the tied teams

Match won 3–0 or 3–1: 3 match points for the winner, 0 match points for the loser
Match won 3–2: 2 match points for the winner, 1 match point for the loser

Regular season

League table (Men's) 

Source: League table (Men's)

League table (Women's) 

Source: League table (Women's)

Results - Male

Round 1

Round 2

Round 3

Round 4

Round 5

Round 6  

Source: Game Schedule (Men's)

Results - Female

Round 1

Round 2

Round 3

Round 4

Round 5

Round 6 

Source: Game Schedule (Women's)

Play-offs

Bracket (Men's )

Bracket (Women's)

Attendance

Men's teams

Women's teams

Top Scorers

Men's

Women's

Player of the Round

Men's

Women's

Final standing

Men's League

Women's League

References

External links
 Official website 

2018 in volleyball
2019 in volleyball
V-League (South Korea)